The Chilapa River is a river located in Guerrero, Mexico. It derives its name from the Nahuatl word chilapan, which translates roughly into "place on the river of chillies". The river runs through the municipality of Chilapa de Álvarez.

See also
List of rivers of Mexico

References

Atlas of Mexico, 1975 (http://www.lib.utexas.edu/maps/atlas_mexico/river_basins.jpg).
The Prentice Hall American World Atlas, 1984.
Rand McNally, The New International Atlas, 1993.

Rivers of Mexico